HMS Zebra was a "Twenty-seven Knotter" destroyer of the Royal Navy, later classified as part of the A Class. Zebra was built by Thames Iron Works and launched in 1895 as the fifth Royal Navy ship to be named Zebra. Entering service in 1900, Zebra was sold for scrap in 1914.

Construction
HMS Zebra was ordered on 7 February 1894 from Thames Iron Works, Blackwall, London as part of the British Admiralty's 1893–1894 shipbuilding programme, one of 36 "Twenty-seven Knotter" destroyers ordered from 14 different shipbuilders for this programme.

Thames Iron Work's design had three funnels, with the forward funnel widely separated from the other two, with one of the two torpedo tubes positioned in this gap.

Zebra was laid down on 1 July 1894 and launched on 13 December 1895. Thames Iron Works was relatively inexperienced in building torpedo craft (it had previously built the hull of a single torpedo boat as a subcontractor for Maudslay, Sons and Field (who supplied the engines for Zebra) and it took a long time for the ship to be completed and to complete trials (where she eventually reached the contract speed of 27 knots), not being accepted by the Navy until January 1900.

Zebra was not particularly successful in service and no further orders for destroyers were placed with Thames Iron Works for many years.

Operational history
HMS Zebra served in British home waters for the whole of her career. In January 1900 she was employed as tender to the Wildfire, special service vessel, for training duties in connection with Sheerness Naval School of Gunnery. The following year she participated in the 1901 British Naval Manoeuvres. In March 1902 Lieutenant James W. G. Innes was appointed in command, but the appointment was cancelled and Lieutenant Wyndham L. Bamber was appointed in command the following month. She served in the Portsmouth Instructional flotilla in May 1902, and took part in the fleet review held at Spithead on 16 August 1902 for the coronation of King Edward VII.

Zebra formed part of the 6th Destroyer Flotilla in 1910, and in 1912. On 14 June 1911 the destroyer  collided with Zebra during night exercises off the mouth of the River Thames. One of Zebras six-pounder guns and two of her boats were knocked into the sea, but no crew were injured. After repair, Zebra was attached to the submarine flotilla based at Dundee, relieving the destroyer .

On 30 August 1912 the Admiralty directed all destroyers were to be grouped into classes designated by letters based on contract speed and appearance. Like all the surviving Twenty-six and Twenty-seven Knotters, Zebra was assigned to the A Class. The class letters were painted on the hull below the bridge area and on a funnel.

By March 1913, Zebra was laid up at Sheerness and listed for sale. Zebra was sold for scrapping on 30 July 1914.

Citations

Bibliography
 
 
 
 
 
 
 
 

 

Zebra-class destroyers
Ships built in Leamouth
1895 ships
A-class destroyers (1913)